The Bank of the Republic of Burundi (BRB) is the central bank of Burundi.  The bank was established in 1966 and its offices are in Bujumbura.

The Bank is active in promoting financial inclusion policy and is a member of the Alliance for Financial Inclusion. It is also one of the original 17 regulatory institutions to make specific national commitments to financial inclusion under the Maya Declaration during the 2011 Global Policy Forum held in Mexico.

The Current governor is Jean Ciza.

History
The central bank evolved step by step:

 Royal Decree of 27 July 1887 establishes the franc as the money of account for the Independent State of Congo, and Burundi is included as well.
 Heligoland Agreement of 1890 puts Rwanda and Burundi within the German sphere of influence in Africa; German East African rupie is the official currency; circulation of the French franc continues nonetheless.
 As a result of Belgium's actions, the Belgian Congo becomes a member of the Latin Monetary Union in 1908.
 Bank of Belgian Congo established in 1909.
 Bank of Belgian Congo issues its first banknotes in 1912.
 Rwanda and Burundi attached to the Congo Franc Zone following Germany's defeat in World War I; 1927
 Colony of Belgian Congo and the Bank of Belgian Congo create a new relationship; 1927 - 1952
 World War II era: temporary involvement of the Bank of England; Congo franc is listed in London.
 Belgian Congo and Ruanda-Urundi Central Bank (BCCBRU) 1952 - 1960
 Banque d' Emission du Rwanda et du Burundi (BERB) / (Issuing Bank of Rwanda and Burundi) - 1960 - 1964
 Banque du Royaume du Burund (BRB) / Royal Bank of Burundi and the Banque Nationale du Rwanda (BNR) open in 1964.
 Banque de la République du Burundi (BRB) opens in 1966.

Governors
Bonaventure Kidwingira, 1967-1977
Elisee Ntahonikora, 1977-1980
Aloys Ntahonkiriye, 1980-1986
Isaac Budabuda, 1987-1992
Mathias Sinamenye, 1992-1998
Grégoire Banyiyezako, 1998-2003
Salvator Toyi, 2003-2006
Gabriel Ntisezerana, 2006-2007
Isaac Bizimana, 2007
Gaspard Sindayigaya, 2007–2012
Jean Ciza, 2012-
Source:

See also

 Burundian franc
 Central banks and currencies of Africa
 Economy of Burundi
 List of central banks

References

External links
  Banque de la République du Burundi

Economy of Burundi
Burundi
Banks established in 1966
1966 establishments in Burundi
Banks of Burundi